This is a list of Legislative Council results for the Victorian 2014 state election.

Results by region

Eastern Metropolitan

Eastern Victoria

Northern Metropolitan

Northern Victoria

South Eastern Metropolitan

Southern Metropolitan

Western Metropolitan

Western Victoria

See also 

 2014 Victorian state election
 Candidates of the 2014 Victorian state election
 Members of the Victorian Legislative Council, 2014–2018

References 

Results of Victorian state elections
Victorian Legislative Council
2010s in Victoria (Australia)